Najjar-e Galin (also Romanized as Najjār-e Galīn and Najjār Galīn; also known as Galin Najjar, Golīn Najjār, and Najjār) is a village in Direh Rural District, in the Central District of Gilan-e Gharb County, Kermanshah Province, Iran. At the 2006 census, its population was 92, in 19 families.

References 

Populated places in Gilan-e Gharb County